The 2019 Gaza economic protests, dubbed as We Want to Live protests, began on February, initiating with the popular call "We want to live" by a group of politically unaffiliated media activists. The group has been nicknamed the 14th March movement. The protests aim at high costs of living and tax hikes in the Gaza Strip.  

The protests were met with violence by the ruling Hamas, which dispatched security forces to disperse protesters. Several human rights organisations and political factions have denounced attacks on protesters by Hamas security forces. The protests were described as the most severe anti-regime protests in Gaza since the Hamas takeover in 2007.

See also

Arab Spring
2011–2012 Palestinian protests

References

Protests in the Gaza Strip
Gaza Strip
2019 protests
2019 in the Gaza Strip
Fatah–Hamas conflict